Michelle M. Pillow is a New York Times and USA Today bestselling novelist with over one million books sold. She is a prolific author, with works spanning across many genres, but is best known for writing romance novels. She is recognized by the Romance Writers of America for writing over one hundred books and is also a member of the Authors Guild.

Career
Michelle is a multi-published author writing in many romance fiction genres that include paranormal, science fiction, fantasy, historical, contemporary, and paranormal women's fiction. Books have been published by Random House, Virgin Books, Ebury, Rouge, Simon and Schuster (Pocket Books), Entangled Publishing, Adams Media, Ellora's Cave Publishing, Samhain Publishing, Running Press, Robinson Publishing, Paranormal Underground Magazine, The Raven Books, and others.

She has a Bachelor of General Studies in History/Business with an English Minor from Fort Hays State University and a Photography degree from the New York Institute of Photography. She was also a journalist and photographer for Paranormal Underground Magazine.

Her romance writing career began in 2004 with her first published book The Mists of Midnight and in 2006 she was awarded the Romantic Times Bookclub Magazine's Reviewer's Choice Award for the historical romance Maiden and the Monster.

The anthology Taming The Alpha hit the New York Times and USA Today in 2014 and included her novel Stirring Up Trouble. In addition, she belonged to the Romance Writers of America, a non-profit organization that focuses on advocacy through increasing public awareness of the romance genre. The Virginia Romance Writers chapter established the HOLT Medallion in 1995 to recognize the achievements of published writers in romantic fiction. In 2015, Michelle received the Virginia Romance Writers HOLT Medallion Award of Merit for outstanding literary fiction for the book Love Potions.

Michelle is also involved in various film and historical documentary projects with her filmmaker husband and played a refugee extra in Z Nation on SyFy that was released in 2016. Dragon Prince received praise in 2019 on SyFy as part of a science fiction and fantasy romance recommendation list.

In 2021, Michelle received a grant from the Mississippi Arts Commission in support of her Order of Magic paranormal women's fiction series.

Fiction Series

Qurilixen World Series 
The Qurilixen World is a collection of multiple interconnected paranormal, fantasy, and science fiction series including Dragon Lords, Lords of the Var, Space Lords, Captured by the Dragon-Shifter, Galaxy Alien Mail Order Brides, Dynasty Lords, and Qurilixen Lords.

Dragon Lords 
 The Barbarian Prince (2004) also appeared as:      Variant: Barbarian Prince (2014) 
 The Perfect Prince (2004) also appeared as:      Variant: Perfect Prince (2014)  
 The Dark Prince (2004) also appeared as:      Variant: Dark Prince (2014) 
 The Warrior Prince (2005) also appeared as:      Variant: Warrior Prince (2014) 
 His Highness the Duke (2012) 
 The Stubborn Lord (2013) 
 The Reluctant Lord (2013) 
 The Impatient Lord (2014) 
 The Dragon's Queen (2014) 
 Dragon Lords: Books 1-4 (2014) 
 Dragon Lords: Books 5-8 (2014)

Lords of the Var 
 The Savage King (2005) 
 The Playful Prince (2005) 
 The Bound Prince (2005) 
 The Rogue Prince (2005) 
 The Pirate Prince (2011)

Space Lords 
 Frost Maiden (2007) also appeared as:      Variant: His Frost Maiden (2014) 
 His Fire Maiden (2016) 
 His Metal Maiden (2016) 
 His Earth Maiden (2018) 
 His Woodland Maiden (2019)

Captured by a Dragon-Shifter 
 Determined Prince (2014) 
 Rebellious Prince (2015) 
 Stranded with the Cajun (2015) 
 Hunted by the Dragon (2016) 
 Mischievous Prince (2017) 
 Headstrong Prince (2017)

Galaxy Alien Mail Order Brides 
 Spark (2016) 
 Flame (2016) 
 Blaze (2016) 
 Ice (2018) 
 Frost (2018) 
Snow (2019)

Dynasty Lords 
 Seduction of the Phoenix (2006) 
 Temptation of the Butterfly (2006)

Qurilixen Lords 
 Dragon Prince (2019) 
 Marked Prince (2020) 
Feral Prince (2021) 
Fire Prince (2022) ISBN 978-1-62501-279-1

Warlocks MacGregor 
 Love Potions (2014) 
 Spellbound (2015) 
 Stirring Up Trouble (2015) 
 Cauldrons and Confessions (2017) 
 Spirits and Spells (2018) 
 Kisses and Curses (2018) 
 Magick and Mischief (2020) 
 A Dash of Destiny (2020) 
Night Magick (2021)

Order of Magic 
 Second Chance Magic (2020) 
 Third Time's a Charm (2020) 
 The Fourth Power (2020) 
 The Fifth Sense (2020) 
The Sixth Spell (2021) 
The Seventh Key (2022) ISBN                                            978-1-62501-280-7

Happily Everlasting 
 Fooled Around and Spelled in Love (2017) 
 Curses and Cupcakes (2017)

(Un)Lucky Valley 
 Better Haunts & Garden Gnomes (2018) also appeared as:     Variant: Better Haunts and Garden Gnomes (2018) 
 Any Witch Way But Goode (2019)

Lords of the Abyss 
 The Mighty Hunter (2006) 
 Commanding the Tides (2007) 
 Captive of the Deep (2010) 
 Surrender to the Sea (2016) 
 Making Waves (2018) 
 The Merman King (2018) 
 Lords of the Abyss: Trilogy (2011) [O/1,2,3] also appeared as:     Variant: Lords of the Abyss: Books 1-3 (2017) 
 Lords of the Abyss Bundle: Books 4-6 Box Set (2018) [O/4-6]

Realm Immortal 
 King of the Unblessed (2006) 
 Faery Queen (2007) 
 Stone Queen (2007)

Divinity Warriors 
 Lilith Enraptured (2009) 
 Fighting Lady Jayne (2009) 
 Keeping Paige (2009) 
 Taking Karre (2009)

Divinity Healers 
 Ariella's Keeper (2009) 
 Seducing Cecilia (2013) 
 Linnea's Arrangement (2013)

Call of the Lycan 
 Call of the Sea (2006) 
 Call of the Untamed (2007) 
 Call of Temptation (2008) 
 Call of the Lycan: Trilogy Box Set (2013)

Naughty Cupid 
 Cupid's Enchantment (2005) 
 Cupid's Revenge (2005) 
 Cupid's Favor (2006)

Tribes of the Vampire 
 Redeemer of Shadows (2005) 
 The Jaded Hunter (2005) 
 Eternally Bound (2006) 
 In Her Shadows (2016)

Novels (Single Titles)
 The Mists of Midnight also appeared as: Variant: Forget Me Not (2004) 
 Red Light Specialists (2005) with Mandy M. Roth 
Pleasure Cruise (2005) with Mandy M. Roth 
 Date with Destiny (2007) with Mandy M. Roth 
 Pleasure Island (2009) with Mandy M. Roth 
Maiden and the Monster (2005) 
Emerald Knight (2005) 
Lord of Fire, Lady of Ice (2013) 
Pride and Prejudice: The Wild and Wanton Edition (2011)

Novellas & Short Fiction
 A Midnight Seduction (2004) 
Portrait of His Obsession (2004) 
Animal Instinct (2004) 
Silk (2005) 
Scorched Destiny (2005) 
Phantom of the Night (2005) 
Taming Him (2005) 
Arrested Desires (2006) 
 Romancing the Recluse (2006) with Mandy M. Roth 
Falcon's Mate (2006) 
Last Man on Earth (2009) 
Faire Justice (2009)  
Good with His Hands (2010) 
Stolen Hours (2011) 
 Everlastingly (2014)

Anthologies
 Ultimate Warriors (2005) with Jaide Fox and Brenna Lyons and Joy Nash 
 Ghost Cats 2 (2006) with Jaycee Clark and Mandy M. Roth 
Taming Him (2007) with Kimberly Dean and Summer Devon 
 Stop Dragon My Heart Around (2007) with Mandy M. Roth 
Prisoner of Love (2009) with Jaid Black and Tawny Taylor 
Ghost Cats. Samhain Publishing. (2011) with Jaycee Clark and Mandy M. Roth 
Taming the Alpha (2014) with Mandy M. Roth, Michelle Pillow, T. S. Joyce, Chloe Cole, V. M. Black, Terah Edun, Carina Wilder, Cathryn Fox, Cristina Rayne, Jaycee Clark, JC Andrijeski, Tasha Black, R.E. Butler, Jaide Fox, Michele Bardsley, Renee George, T.J. Michaels, Elsa Jade, Allison Gatta, Arial Burnz, Mandy Rosko, Candice Gilmer, Dawn Michelle, Sylvia Frost, Lissa Matthews, and Lexy Cole 
Kiss of Christmas Magic (2014)  with Eve Langlais, Aubrey Rose, Molly Prince, Deanna Chase, Mandy M. Roth, Michelle M. Pillow, Angie Fox, Mimi Strong, Viola Rivard, Michele Bardsley, V.M. Black, Lola St. Vil, Terah Edun, Jessa Slade, Chloe Cole, Cristina Rayne, Shawntelle Madison, J.S. Hope, Carina Wilder, Dawn Michelle, and Jessica Ryan
Taming the Monster (2015)  with Mandy M. Roth, Michelle M. Pillow, Carina Wilder, Cristina Rayne, Eve Vaughn, Jaide Fox, JC Andrijeski, Kim Knox, Michele Bardsley, Renee George, Mandy Rosko, Tracey H. Kitts, Ella Drake, Jaycee Clark, Candice Gilmer, Lexy Cox, and Jessica Collins 
A Very Alpha Christmas (2015)  with Mandy M. Roth, Michelle M. Pillow, Cathryn Fox, Arial Burnz, Jaycee Clark, Slyvia Frost, Candice Gilmer, Tasha Black, T.J. Michaels, Renee George, Dawn Michelle, Lissa Matthews, Jaide Fox, Elsa Jade, R.E. Butler, Mandy Rosko, T.S. Joyce, Carina Wilder, Chloe Cole, Cristina Rayne, Lexy Cole, J.C. Andrijeski, and Michele Bardsley
Taming the Vampire  (2016)  by Mandy M. Roth, Michelle M. Pillow, Kristen Painter, Yasmine Galenorn, Colleen Gleason, Jennifer Ashley, V. Vaughn, Carmen Caine, Marie Mason, Mina Carter, Deanna Chase, Emma Storm, Patricia A. Rasey,  Alyssa Day, Caridad Piñeiro, Erin Kellison, Laurie London, Selene Charles, Chloe Cole, Elle Thorne, Tasha Black, J.C. Andrijeski, Jaide Fox, Tracey H. Kitts, Charlene Hartnady, Teresa Gabelman, Celia Kyle, and P. Jameson 
Alphas for the Holidays (2016)  with Mandy M. Roth, Michelle M. Pillow, Celia Kyle, Elle Thorne, Mina Carter, P. Jameson, Kristen Painter, Chloe Cole, Colleen Gleason, K.F. Breene, Bella Love-Wins, Deanna Chase, Jennifer Blackstream, Angie Fox, Ann Gimpel, Christine Pope, Marie Mason, Anthea Lawson, Bianca D'Arc, Jovee Winters, Tasha Black, JC Andrijeski, Dawn Montgomery, Jaycee Clark, Suzanne Rock, Tracey H. Kitts, Celeste Anwar, and Jax Cassidy

Non-Fiction 

 The Write Ingredients: Recipes from Your Favorite Authors Samhain Publishing. (2007) along with Lori Foster and Diane Castell, contributing authors include: Jim Alexander, Susan Andersen, Liz Andrews, Cynthianna Appel, Becky Barker, Jules Bennett, Lucinda Betts, Toni Blake, Allie Boniface, Denysé Bridger, Gemma Bruce, Jaci Burton, Stella Cameron, Mary Campisi, Tori Carrington, Cindy Carver, Billie Warren Chai, Celine Chatillon, Colleen Collins, Debby Conrad, Jodi Lynn Copeland, Sydney Croft, Cindy Cruciger, Paige Cuccaro, Bianca D'Arc, Gia Dawn, Sylvia Day, Jamie Denton, Danielle Devon, Roseanne Dowell, Christine Feehan, Kate Fellowes, Holly Fitzgerald, Suzanne Forster, Jenny Gardiner, Amber Green, Tilly Greene, Heather Grothaus, Rosey Haggerty, Karen Harper, Ingela F. Hyatt, Larissa Ione, Marcia James, Nicole Jordan, Sylvie Kaye, Susan Kearney, Mia King, Karen Kendall, Susanne Marie Knight, Jayne Ann Krentz, Rosemary Laurey, Kathleen              Lawless, Jo Leigh, Toni Leland, Julie Leto, Cathy Liggett, Patricia Lorenz, Larissa Lyons, Allie Mackay, Donna MacMeans, Catherine Mann, Janice Maynard, Cheyenne McCray, Amanda McIntyre, LuAnn McLane, Patrice Michelle, Cindi Myers, Rhonda Nelson, Brenda Novak, Susan Elizabeth Phillips, Michelle M. Pillow,  Mary Jo Putney, Anne Rainey, Tonya Ramagos, Joanne Rock, Patricia Sargeant, Melissa Schroeder, Shana Schwer, Jill Shalvis, Jennah Sharpe, Suzanne Simmons, Catherine Spaulding, Michele Stegman, Kay Stockham, Karin Tabke, Jean Marie Ward, Ann M. Warner, Nancy Warren, Carys Weldon, SueEllen Welfonder, Diane Whiteside, Lori Wilde, J.C. Wilder, Brenda Williamson, C. J. Winters, Justine Wittich.

References

External links 
 
Michelle M. Pillow at the Internet Speculative Fiction Database

21st-century American novelists
Writers of historical romances
American fantasy writers
American science fiction writers
Women mystery writers
21st-century American women writers
American women novelists
American paranormal romance writers
Women romantic fiction writers
Women science fiction and fantasy writers
Living people
Year of birth missing (living people)